The following is a list of notable events and releases of the year 1888 in Norwegian music.

Events

Deaths

 June
 22 – Edmund Neupert, pianist and composer (born 1842).

Births

 November
 8 – David Monrad Johansen, composer (died 1974).

See also
 1888 in Norway
 Music of Norway

References

 
Norwegian music
Norwegian
Music
1880s in Norwegian music